In late October 2021, clashes occurred in Galmudug, Somalia between the Somali Army and Ahlu Sunna Waljama'a, a Sufi militia.

Timeline 
On 30 September 2021, Somali Armed Forces attacked the Ahlu Sunnah Wal Jama'a (ASWJ) fighters in Galmudug state. ASWJ took control of Mataban and Guriceel towns following the clashes. On 1 October 2021 ASWJ rebels took control of Guriel followed by Eldhere day later.

The clashes erupted on 23 October in the Guriel District. On 25 October, local government said that 16 soldiers had been killed. The ASWJ said the total death toll from the clashes is at least 120.

The ASWJ had been a government ally in fighting the civil war from 2010, but their previous arrangement broke down. The ASWJ first fought against the army in February 2020.

References

2021 in Somalia
Battles in 2021
Battles of the Somali Civil War (2009–present)
2021 clashes
October 2021 events in Africa